The Ciona intestinalis protein database (CIPRO) is a protein database for the tunicate species C. intestinalis.

See also
 Ciona intestinalis

References

External links
 http://cipro.ibio.jp/2.5

Biological databases
Enterogona
Computer-related introductions in 2010